Sean X. Sun is an American biophysicist.

Sun completed a Bachelor of Science degree from Pennsylvania State University in 1994, and obtained a doctorate at the University of California, Berkeley in 1998. He teaches at Johns Hopkins University, where he operates the Cell Mechanics Group laboratory. Sun was elected a fellow of the American Physical Society in 2016. The American Institute for Medical and Biological Engineering granted Sun an equivalent honor the following year.

References

Living people
American biomedical engineers
American mechanical engineers
Fellows of the American Physical Society
University of California, Berkeley alumni
Pennsylvania State University alumni
Fellows of the American Institute for Medical and Biological Engineering
21st-century American engineers
American biophysicists
Year of birth missing (living people)